Shady Dale is a town in Jasper County, Georgia, United States. The population was 249 at the 2010 census.

History
Shady Dale was founded ca. 1880 on the site of a former Creek Indian settlement. The name "Shady Dale" was descriptively applied.

The Georgia General Assembly incorporated Shady Dale as a town in 1889.

Geography

Shady Dale is located in northeastern Jasper County at  (33.399562, -83.589937). Georgia State Routes 83 and 142 intersect in the center of town. GA 83 leads northeast  to Madison and southwest  to Monticello, the Jasper county seat, while GA 142 leads northwest  to Newborn and southeast  to Willard.

The east side of town drains toward the Little River, a tributary of the Oconee River, while the west side drains to Murder Creek, a tributary of the Little River. The town is home to the Silver Bullet Hunting club.

Demographics

As of the census of 2000, there were 242 people, 88 households, and 60 families residing in the town. The racial makeup of the town was 65.29% White, 28.10% African American, 6.61% from other races. Hispanic or Latino of any race were 6.61% of the population.

There were 88 households, out of which 29.5% had children under the age of 18 living with them, 56.8% were married couples living together, 10.2% had a female householder with no husband present, and 30.7% were non-families. 28.4% of all households were made up of individuals, and 12.5% had someone living alone who was 65 years of age or older.  The average household size was 2.75 and the average family size was 3.41.

In the town, the population was spread out, with 27.7% under the age of 18, 7.9% from 18 to 24, 26.9% from 25 to 44, 25.2% from 45 to 64, and 12.4% who were 65 years of age or older.  The median age was 35 years. For every 100 females, there were 101.7 males.  For every 100 females age 18 and over, there were 88.2 males.

The median income for a household in the town was $35,469, and the median income for a family was $36,042. Males had a median income of $31,000 versus $21,607 for females. The per capita income for the town was $10,791.  About 10.5% of families and 14.6% of the population were below the poverty line, including 14.3% of those under the age of eighteen and 19.2% of those 65 or over.

Arts and culture
The town is well known for an annual professional rodeo the first weekend in June each year since 1983. Sanctioned by the I.P.R.A./S.R.A., this rodeo draws champion cowboys and cowgirls from all over the United States. The entire town comes to life with a rodeo parade, wagon train ride and community festival. The event is produced by Walton No. 200 and Jasper No. 50 Masonic Lodges of Jasper County with proceeds benefiting several Masonic charities.

References

External links
 Providence Baptist Church historical marker

Towns in Jasper County, Georgia
Towns in Georgia (U.S. state)